Sewickley Manor, also known as the Pollins Farmstead, is a historic home and farm located in Mount Pleasant Township, Westmoreland County, Pennsylvania.  The house was built about 1852, and is a two-story, brick dwelling with a two-story frame addition in the Greek Revival style. The farmstead includes the following contributing outbuildings: Smoke house (c. 1790s), spring house (c. 1850s), chicken coop (c. 1880s), machinery shed (c. 1880s), wagon shed (c. 1880s), outbuilding (c. 1880s), pig pen (c. 1880s), barn (1849), tenant house (before 1900), and sheep shed (c. 1880s).

It was added to the National Register of Historic Places in 1983.

References

Farms on the National Register of Historic Places in Pennsylvania
Greek Revival houses in Pennsylvania
Houses completed in 1852
Houses in Westmoreland County, Pennsylvania
National Register of Historic Places in Westmoreland County, Pennsylvania
1852 establishments in Pennsylvania